The Fairey Firefly was a British fighter of the 1920s from Fairey Aviation.
It was a single-seat, single-engine biplane of mixed construction.

Development
The Firefly was a private-venture design, penned by Marcel Lobelle. It was first flown on 9 November 1925 by Norman Macmillan.
The Air Ministry did not pursue the project, partly because of the American Curtiss engine used  and partly because of its wooden construction  and the Firefly I did not enter production.

Specifications (Firefly I)

See also

References

1920s British fighter aircraft
Firefly I
Biplanes
Single-engined tractor aircraft
Aircraft first flown in 1925